Sabyasachi Chowdhury (born 31 October 1989) is an Indian Bengali television actor who is known for portraying Bamakhepa in the TV serial Mahapeeth Tarapeeth, a mythological show which aired on Star Jalsha, also worked in Saat Bhai Champa.

Career
Sabyasachi started his career in television as an actor and acted in serials like Esho Maa Lokkhi, Agnijal, Bhakter Bhogoban Sri Krishna, Jhumur, Om Namoh Shivaay, Saath Bhai Champa. Now he is working in Bengali television series Mahapeeth Tarapeeth. The series was aired on Star Jalsha and as of January 2021, completed more than 500 episodes.

TV series
 Mahapeeth Tarapeeth as Bama Charan Chotopadhay / Sadhak Bamakhyapa / Bama
 Saat Bhai Champa as King Nakshatrajyoti
 Jarowar Jhumko as Arnab
 Om Namoh Shivaay as Lord Vishnu
 Jhumur
 Bhakter Bhogobaan Shri Krishna as Yudhisthira
 Agnijal
 Esho Maa Lokkhi

References

Bengali actors
Living people
1995 births